Berkeley Poetry Review (BPR) is an American poetry journal published annually by the undergraduate students at the University of California, Berkeley since 1974.

The journal has featured a wide array of poets and writers, including:
 Pablo Neruda
 Czesław Miłosz
 Lawrence Ferlinghetti
 Thom Gunn
 Leslie Scalapino 
 Galway Kinnell

External links
"BPR website"
"BPR blog"

 

Poetry magazines published in the United States
Student magazines published in the United States
Annual magazines published in the United States
Magazines established in 1974
Magazines published in California
University of California, Berkeley